On 3 March 1982, opposition politician and leader of the MLPC party, Ange-Félix Patassé, returned from exile to the Central African Republic and staged an unsuccessful coup against General André Kolingba (who himself took power in the 1981 coup d'état) with the help of a few military officers, such as General François Bozizé, who accused Kolingba of treason and proclaimed the change of power in a radio announcement.

Four days later, having failed to gain the support of the Central African Armed Forces, Patassé went in disguise to the French Embassy in Bangui to seek refuge. After heated negotiations between the Kolingba government and France, Patassé was allowed to leave for exile in Togo. Bozizé fled to the north of the country with 100 soldiers, before obtaining refuge in France.

References

Bibliography

 

Central African Republic coup d'état attempt, 1982
Military coups in the Central African Republic
Coup d'état attempt
Central African Republic coup d'état attempt
Central African Republic coup d'état attempt
Attempted coups d'état in the Central African Republic